Ardozyga pelogramma is a species of moth in the family Gelechiidae. It was described by Edward Meyrick in 1904. It is found in Australia, where it has been recorded from Victoria.

The forewings are whitish-fuscous densely irrorated with dark fuscous and with a moderate irregular pale reddish-ochreous longitudinal streak above the middle from the base to near the apex, irregularly streaked with white, the upper edge ill-defined, with three anteriorly oblique wedge-shaped projections almost reaching the costal edge on the anterior half, the lower edge well-defined, at first straight, then with two semi-oval indentations representing the large discal stigmata, and an irregular indentation between them. There is an elongate whitish dot on the fold about the middle, and a short pale ochreous dash towards the tornus. The hindwings are grey, darker posteriorly, near the base paler and thinly scaled.

References

Ardozyga
Moths described in 1904
Taxa named by Edward Meyrick
Moths of Australia